Gursharan Owsta (also Romanized as Gūrsharān Owstā; also known as Kūrsharān) is a village in Mahur Berenji Rural District, Sardasht District, Dezful County, Khuzestan Province, Iran. At the 2006 census, its population was 39, in 5 families.

References 

Populated places in Dezful County